RoboCop is a 1987 American cyberpunk action film.

Robocop or RoboCop may also refer to:

Media
RoboCop (franchise), an American superhero cyberpunk media franchise
RoboCop (1988 video game), a beat 'em up/run and gun arcade game
RoboCop 2, a 1990 sequel to the 1987 film
RoboCop 3, a 1993 sequel to the 1990 film
RoboCop (2003 video game), a first-person shooter video game based on the RoboCop films
RoboCop (2014 film), an American cyberpunk superhero action film and a remake of the 1987 film
RoboCop (character), a fictional robotically enhanced Detroit police officer
RoboCop (comics), a number of comic book series spun off from the feature film of the same name
RoboCop (American TV series), a 1988 animated television series
RoboCop (live action TV series), a 1994 live-action television series
RoboCop: Alpha Commando, a 1998 animated television series
"RoboCop" (song), a song by American hip hop artist Kanye West
Robo Cop, a fictional character from the 2018 Korean film Are You Human?

People
Ray Mallon (born 1955; nicknamed "Robocop"), British politician
 Charles Robert "Gobotron" McDowell, U.S. musician also known as "Robo Cop"
Ulf Samuelsson (born 1964; nicknamed "Robocop"), retired Swedish-American professional ice hockey defenceman

See also

 "Robot Cop" (TV episode), an episode of Pleasant Goat and Big Big Wolf; see List of Pleasant Goat and Big Big Wolf episodes
bomb disposal robot, a type of police robot